A Performance of Hamlet in the Village of Mrdusa Donja is a 1973 Yugoslav drama film directed by Krsto Papić, and based on Ivo Brešan's 1971 play of the same name.

Cast
 Rade Šerbedžija as Joco / Hamlet
 Milena Dravić as Anđa / Ofelija
 Krešimir Zidarić as Bukara / Kralj
 Fabijan Šovagović as Učitelj Andro
 Izet Hajdarhodžić as Jocin Otac
 Ljubiša Samardžić as Mačak
 Mate Ergović as Simurina
 Zvonko Lepetić as Mile
 Zdenka Heršak as Mara
 Ilija Ivezić
 Ivo Pajić
 Slavica Maras
 Rikard Brzeska
 Nevenka Šain (as Nevenka Šajin)
 Branko Matić
 Jovan Stefanović

References

External links

1973 films
1973 drama films
Yugoslav drama films
Yugoslav films based on plays
Croatian drama films
1970s Croatian-language films
Films directed by Krsto Papić
Films based on Hamlet
Jadran Film films
Films set in Croatia
Films set in Yugoslavia
Films based on works by Croatian writers